Stathmopoda aconias is a species of moth of the family Stathmopodidae. It is found in India and Sri Lanka.

References

Stathmopodidae
Moths of Asia
Moths of Sri Lanka
Moths described in 1910